Trichlora is a genus of Peruvian plants in the onion subfamily within the Amaryllis family. There are 4 known species, all endemic to Perú.

Trichlora huascarana Ravenna - Perú (Ancash)
Trichlora lactea Ravenna - Perú (Cajamarca )
Trichlora peruviana Baker - Perú (Lima, Cusco)
Trichlora sandwithii Vargas - Perú (Apurímac)

References

Amaryllidaceae genera
Endemic flora of Peru
Taxa named by John Gilbert Baker
Allioideae